Kara Mia is a 2019 Philippine drama television series broadcast by GMA Network. The series premiered on the network's Telebabad evening block and worldwide on GMA Pinoy TV from February 18, 2019 to June 28, 2019, replacing Cain at Abel. It was replaced by The Better Woman in Sahaya's timeslot.

Series overview

Episodes

February 2019

March 2019

April 2019

May 2019

June 2019

Episodes notes

References

Lists of Philippine drama television series episodes